William George Kini (9 July 1937 – 30 August 2012) was a New Zealand heavyweight boxer and rugby union prop.  He won a gold medal for boxing at the 1966 British Empire and Commonwealth Games and placed second in the 1962 British Empire and Commonwealth Games.

Biography
Kini was born in Winton in 1937. Of Ngāi Tahu descent, he was educated at Southland Technical College in Invercargill.

He won the first of his seven New Zealand heavyweight boxing titles in 1959. At the 1962 British Empire and Commonwealth Games he won the silver medal in the 81–91 kg (heavyweight) division. Four years later, he won gold in the same division at the Kingston Commonwealth Games.

In the early 1960s, Kini played prop for the Otahuhu rugby team in the Auckland club competition, winning the Gallaher Shield four times. He also captained the Auckland Māori rugby team.

Kini and his family moved to Whangārei in 1980. He was the strapper and masseur for the Northland rugby team for 11 years until 2003.

He was inducted into the New Zealand Māori Sports Hall of Fame in 2004.

Kini died in Whangārei in 2012, as a result of complications from a cancerous tumour on his spine.

References

1937 births
2012 deaths
People from Winton, New Zealand
Ngāi Tahu people
Heavyweight boxers
Boxers at the 1962 British Empire and Commonwealth Games
Boxers at the 1966 British Empire and Commonwealth Games
Commonwealth Games gold medallists for New Zealand
Commonwealth Games silver medallists for New Zealand
New Zealand male boxers
People educated at Aurora College (Invercargill)
New Zealand Māori sportspeople
Commonwealth Games medallists in boxing
Medallists at the 1962 British Empire and Commonwealth Games
Medallists at the 1966 British Empire and Commonwealth Games